Didier Reynders (born 6 August 1958) is a Belgian politician and a member of the Mouvement Réformateur (MR) serving as European Commissioner for Justice since 2019. He held various positions in public institutions before becoming a member of the House in 1992. He was a minister without interruption from 1999 to 2019, until resigning to become Belgian European Commissioner.

He served as Federal Minister of Finance until December 2011 in six different governments, then Federal Minister for Foreign Affairs, Trade Foreign Affairs and European Affairs in two governments. Following the government crisis of December 2018, he was also appointed to the post of Minister of Defense until November 2019.

Early life and education
Reynders was born in Liège as the youngest in a family of three children. He studied law at the University of Liège.

Early career
Reynders began his career as a lawyer in 1981, before serving as Chairman of the National Railway Company of Belgium from 1986 to 1991.

Political career

Minister of Finance, 1999–2011
Reynders served as Minister of Finance from 1999 to 2011; in 2002, he chaired the G-10 which is the meeting of the main creditor states (Belgium, Canada, France, Germany, Italy, Japan, the Netherlands, Sweden, Switzerland, the United Kingdom and the United States).

Reynders became Deputy Prime Minister in 2004, in the government of Prime Minister Guy Verhofstadt. He was the chairman of the Mouvement Réformateur from 2004 to 2011.

Reynders led the MR to a victory in the 2007 general elections, with the MR becoming the largest Francophone party of Belgium. The King appointed Reynders as informateur, i.e. to start off the informal coalition talks for a new federal government.

Stalemate followed the 2010 general election. The King appointed a succession of people to negotiate a coalition from June 2010 onwards, but none succeeded in the task of forming a new government during the following seven months. Reynders was appointed informateur by the King on 2 February 2011. He reported on 16 February 2011, and his brief was extended through 1 March 2011.

Minister of Foreign Affairs, 2011–2019
Following the appointment of Elio Di Rupo as new Belgian Prime Minister in December 2011, Reynders became Minister of Foreign Affairs. During his tenure, Belgium was elected as a non-permanent member of the United Nations Security Council (2019–2020), as well as of the United Nations Human Rights Council (2016–2018).

Minister of Defence, 2018–2019
After the ruling coalition collapsed in 2019, Reynders also held responsibility for the defense portfolio. Following an inconclusive election in May 2019, King Philippe asked Reynders and Johan Vande Lanotte to look into the conditions required for forming a coalition government.

European Commissioner for Justice, 2019–present
In the summer of 2019, Belgian Prime Minister Charles Michel put Reynders forward as the Belgian nominee for the incoming European Commission. President-elect Ursula von der Leyen nominated him for the Justice portfolio. Reynders' hearing at the European Parliament was held in September 2019 and his nomination was approved by a large majority. He took office on 1 December 2019.

In 2020, Reynders announced plans to develop a legislative proposal by 2021 requiring businesses to carry out due diligence in relation to the potential human rights and environmental impacts of their operations and supply chains.

A 2022 report stated that Reynders was one of at least five senior EU officials targeted by Israeli spyware in 2021.

Other activities

International organisations
 African Development Bank (AfDB), Ex-Officio Member of the Board of Governors (1999–2011)
 Asian Development Bank (ADB), Ex-Officio Member of the Board of Governors (1999–2011)
 European Bank for Reconstruction and Development (EBRD), Ex-Officio Member of the Board of Governors (1999–2011)

Non-profit organisations
 European Council on Foreign Relations (ECFR), Member

Controversies

Political activities
In 2015, Reynders drew criticism for having his face painted black during a traditional festival in Brussels.

In April 2017, Belgium voted in favour of the entry of Saudi Arabia, yet considered one of the most retrograde countries on the issue of women's rights, in the United Nations Commission on the Status of Women. This decision raised controversy and questions about the role of Reynders.

In 2019, Reynders announced his candidacy to succeed Thorbjørn Jagland as Secretary General of the Council of Europe; the position instead went to Marija Pejčinović Burić.

Criminal investigation
In September 2019, Belgian police investigated allegations of corruption and money-laundering against Reynders, relating to the construction of the Belgian embassy building in Kinshasa, the lease of a federal police HQ and other matters. The investigation was dropped soon after.

Honours

National honours
 2014: Grand Officer of the Order of Leopold

Foreign honours
 2013: Commander in the Legion of Honour
 2014: Knight Grand Cross of the Order of Merit of the Federal Republic of Germany
 2016: Knight Grand Cross of the Order of Orange-Nassau
 2016: Knight Grand Cross in the Order of Merit

References

External links

 

|-

|-

|-

1958 births
21st-century Belgian politicians
Belgian European Commissioners
Finance ministers of Belgium
Foreign ministers of Belgium
Grand Crosses with Star and Sash of the Order of Merit of the Federal Republic of Germany
Knights Grand Cross of the Order of Orange-Nassau
Living people
Members of the Belgian Federal Parliament
Reformist Movement politicians
Politicians from Liège
University of Liège alumni
Belgian Ministers of Defence
European Commissioners 2019–2024